Medusa is the second studio album by Dutch dark wave band Clan of Xymox. It was released on 1 November 1986 by 4AD. Founding member Pieter Nooten re-recorded the songs "After the Call" and "Theme I" on Sleeps with the Fishes, his 1987 collaborative album with Michael Brook, following a brief split from the band.

Critical reception 

Medusa is seen by some critics as the group's career high point. Sounds described Medusa as an "overriding achievement [...] every track sounds like the finale to a brooding epic overture".

Melody Maker wrote, "Sleek, efficient, even dramatic, Xymox understand the value of a direct understatement [...] [Medusa is] a bright flash of hope in these blackout days".

Track listing

Personnel 
 Ronny Moorings – vocals, guitar, keyboards
 Anka Wolbert – vocals, keyboards, bass guitar
 Pieter Nooten – vocals, keyboards

 Technical
 John Fryer – production, engineering
 Keith Mitchell – engineering
 Vaughan Oliver – sleeve graphic design
 Nigel Grierson – sleeve photography

References

External links 
 

1986 albums
Dark wave albums
4AD albums
Albums produced by John Fryer (producer)
Clan of Xymox albums